The Women's individual pursuit competition at the 2021 UCI Track Cycling World Championships was held on 23 October 2021.

Results

Qualifying
The Qualifying was started at 13:25. The two fasters riders will race for gold and the third and fourth fastest riders will race for bronze.

Finals
The finals were started at 19:41.

References

Women's individual pursuit